Kompolt is a village in Heves county, Hungary, lying  west of Füzesabony, on the River Gyöngyös.

History
Kompolt was the seat of the Aba clan. László IV permitted the setting up of a Benedictine monastery in 1280, which was destroyed in 1552.

Population
Kompolt has a population of nearly 2,250. On several occasions Kompolt lost its population. Kató Hámán a communist workers heroine was born here in 1884.

Communications
Kompolt is  both from Road 3 and the Budapest-Miskolc railway line. It also has a railway station on the Kál-Bátonyterenye branch line.

Economy
The main activity was farming, especially production of folder crops and latterly tobacco. The Plant Improvement Institute, founded in 1918 by Rudolf Fleischmann and named after him is renowned throughout Europe. The Institute is still involved with plant breeding such as alfalfa, hemp and cereals).

Landmarks
Among the sightseeing spots, the former Grassalkovich Castle, built in 1750 in Baroque style, is worth looking at. A granary was additionally built beside the castle in 1770. Its basement has quarters which were built in the Middle Ages and are covered with staved brick arches presumably built by the Benedictines. The Neo-Romantic Catholic church with one tower was built in 1858. Both buildings are monuments. There is little tourism.

References

Grassalkovich family
Populated places in Heves County